Ibrahim Al-Subaie (born October 6, 1986) is a Saudi football player who plays a defender.  He played in the Pro League for Al-Ansar.

References

1986 births
Living people
Saudi Arabian footballers
Al-Ansar FC (Medina) players
Ohod Club players
Saudi First Division League players
Saudi Professional League players
Saudi Second Division players
Association football defenders